Alvin and the Chipmunks Meet the Wolfman is a 2000 American animated horror musical dark comedy film produced by Bagdasarian Productions and Universal Cartoon Studios and based on characters from Alvin and the Chipmunks. It is the second Alvin and the Chipmunks direct-to-video film, and the second of three Universal Cartoon Studios productions to be animated overseas by Tama Productions in Tokyo, Japan. Featuring voices of Maurice LaMarche and Miriam Flynn.

Universal Studios Home Video released it on VHS with Alvin and the Chipmunks Meet Frankenstein, Monster Mash, and four episodes of Archie's Weird Mysteries (combined into one feature, Archie and the Riverdale Vampires) as part of its "Haunted House of Fun" promotion. Then on September 7, 2004, all four animated films are released together on a "Monster Bash Fun Pack" DVD set, a two-disc DVD set featuring Alvin and the Chipmunks Meet Frankenstein and was released on September 4, 2007.

Plot
Simon and Dave claim that Alvin's nightmares of meeting the Wolfman are due to him watching too many horror films at night. Alvin says that it is because their new neighbor, Lawrence Talbot, creeps him out and speculates that he is hiding something. When yet another accident caused by Alvin when mixing unknown chemicals results in a huge explosion and mess of the school auditorium, along with Dave getting a call from Miss Miller about the Chipettes being scared after being spooked by something while walking home with the Chipmunks one night, Dave and Principal Milliken decide that Alvin should be pulled out of his role as Mr. Hyde in their school play for Dr. Jekyll and Mr Hyde, and is given the role of the butler instead (much to Mr. Rochelle's dismay) with Dave confiscating all of Alvin's monster paraphernalia. To boost his self-esteem, they decide to have Theodore replace the part. Principal Milliken expects Theodore to start standing up for himself when Dave sees Nathan, a bully, causing him trouble.

Alvin and Simon begin searching for proof that Mr. Talbot is a werewolf. Theodore gets bit by a large dog (though it was actually a werewolf) on his way home after giving a necklace to Eleanor, whom he has a crush on. The next day at the rehearsal, Theodore does an impression of Mr. Hyde. Despite this triumph, Theodore transforms into a puppy-like werewolf by night, and his personality continues to drastically change by the day. With their brother cursed with Lycanthropy, Alvin and Simon search for a way to help Theodore and save the play without Dave finding out. Despite their best efforts, they find no solution. They eventually decide to take up advice from psychic Madame Raya. She says that Theodore is close to the animal state and will soon become an adult werewolf. Simon and Alvin ask her if there is any way to cure him without also killing him. She suggests knocking him out with a silver cane before the next full moon when the transformation will be complete. Alvin later breaks into Mr. Talbot's home and steals his silver cane, which Theodore then splits in two after Alvin knocks him with it, but Theodore is not cured. However, as he runs away with it, he knocks into Dave. That night, Dave goes to see Mr. Talbot to apologize and explain everything to him. During the conversation, in which Talbot mentions an ancestor killed by a silver bullet, the full moon rises, and he transforms. Terrified, Dave (now fully realizing that Alvin was indeed telling the truth about Talbot all along) runs to the school to warn the boys. However, he's knocked unconscious by a pole. Having followed Dave, Mr. Talbot makes his way inside and chases after Alvin (who realizes he was right to suspect Mr. Talbot).

During the play, Theodore turns into a werewolf while and attacks Eleanor. However, after cornering her, the necklace Theodore gave her earlier shines by the moon, causing Theodore to remember his feelings towards her and flee. Eleanor follows him, determined to help him, only to almost be attacked by Mr. Talbot, who was the werewolf that bit Theodore. Theodore quickly defends her and attacks Mr. Talbot, and the two battle. As a result of the bite, Theodore turns back into a chipmunk, and Talbot returns to normal. Talbot then runs off the stage. Confused by what happened, Simon explains to everyone how the bite cured them by causing the effect to reverse on them both. Alvin quickly runs up to the stage to join in the applause by the crowd, who believes the entire incident was just an act. At the wrap party, they find out Mr. Talbot will succeed Milliken as the new principal while she takes a less stressful job as a demolition worker.

Cast
 Ross Bagdasarian Jr. as Alvin Seville / Simon Seville / David "Dave" Seville
 Janice Karman as Theodore Seville / Brittany Miller / Jeanette Miller / Eleanor Miller
 Maurice LaMarche as Mr. Lawrence Talbot / The Wolfman
 Miriam Flynn as Principal Milliken
 April Winchell as Madame Raya
 Rob Paulsen as Mr. Rochelle
 Dody Goodman as Miss Miller (archive recording)
 Elizabeth Daily as Nathan
 Frank Welker as Special Vocal Effects for Theodore and Mr. Talbot's werewolf forms

Ginny McSwain served as casting and voice director.

Musical numbers
Soundtrack available on MCA Records.
 "Munks on a Mission" - Alvin and Simon
 "Monster Out in You" - The Chipmunks
 "Everything's Gonna Be Alright" - The Chipmunks and the Chipettes

Release
The film was initially released on VHS by Universal Studios Home Video on August 29, 2000 alongside Alvin and the Chipmunks Meet Frankenstein, Monster Mash and four episodes of Archie's Weird Mysteries (combined into one feature, "Archie and the Riverdale Vampires") as part of its "Haunted House of Fun" promotion. On September 7, 2004, all four animated films were released together on a "Monster Bash Fun Pack" DVD set.

A "Scare-riffic Double Feature" two-disc DVD set alongside Meet Frankenstein was released on September 4, 2007, and re-released with a different cover on March 11, 2008.

References

External links

 

2000 films
2000 animated films
2000 comedy horror films
2000s American animated films
2000s children's animated films
2000 direct-to-video films
American animated horror films
American comedy horror films
American supernatural horror films
Children's horror films
Animated crossover films
Direct-to-video sequel films
Alvin and the Chipmunks films
2000s English-language films
Werewolves in animated film
Films scored by Mark Watters
Universal Pictures direct-to-video films
Universal Pictures direct-to-video animated films
Universal Animation Studios animated films